Girl Most Likely is a 2012 American comedy film directed by Shari Springer Berman and Robert Pulcini. Based on a screenplay by Michelle Morgan, the film stars Kristen Wiig as a playwright who stages a suicide in an attempt to win back her ex, only to wind up in the custody of her gambling-addict mother, played by Annette Bening. Matt Dillon, Christopher Fitzgerald, Natasha Lyonne, and Darren Criss co-star.

The film was screened under its original title Imogene at the 2012 Toronto International Film Festival in September 2012. The same month, Lionsgate bought the US distribution rights following its Toronto premiere and released it with Roadside Attractions on July 19, 2013.

Plot
Imogene Duncan (Kristen Wiig) was once a promising playwright who now works in a low-paying magazine job in New York City. After her affluent boyfriend leaves her and she is fired from her magazine gig, she stages a suicide attempt in an effort to get her ex's attention but is accidentally discovered by her friend Dara. Held in the hospital on a 5150 (involuntary psychiatric hold), she is eventually released into the care of her estranged mother (Annette Bening), who takes Imogene to her childhood home in New Jersey.

Shortly after returning, she hears a conversation between her mother and her new boyfriend, George Bousche, and learns that her father never died, but instead left the family to pursue a PhD. Finding out her father wrote a book, she goes to the local library and steals it. Reading on the back cover that he lives in New York City, she convinces her mother's boarder, Lee (Darren Criss), to take her there. However, she is forced to return after she is barred access to her apartment and her friend, Dara, refuses to let her stay in her home.

To pay Lee back for driving her, Imogene goes to see him perform in his Backstreet Boys tribute band. Afterwards they talk about her failed career as a playwright. Years ago, after she won a prestigious grant, Imogene failed to write an actual play and now believes she cannot write. Lee accidentally discovered her old plays while living in her room and believes she is talented and should attempt to write again. They sleep together and the following morning she, Lee and her brother, Ralph, head back to the city for Dara's book launch party.

The launch goes poorly for Imogene, as no one is particularly happy to see her. Her brother Ralph is nearly arrested and is brought to the party by the police. After they leave, Ralph takes them to their father's house where Ralph reveals that he knew he was alive the entire time. Imogene and Ralph have dinner with their wealthy father and his new wife where he expresses no remorse for leaving them.

When their father offers Imogene money to help fix her life, she leaves him and returns home to her mother. After they discuss her father, an assassin, arrives looking for Bousche and threatens to kill them all. He is prevented from doing so by Imogene, who dons her brother's human exo-skeleton suit and attacks him.

Ultimately Imogene writes a play based on her experiences called Exo-life starring Julia Stiles, which receives a standing ovation.

Cast
 Kristen Wiig as Imogene Duncan
Sydney Lucas as Young Imogene Duncan
Julia Stiles as Stage Imogene Duncan
 Annette Bening as Zelda
 Matt Dillon as "George Bousche"
 Darren Criss as Lee
 Christopher Fitzgerald as Ralph
 Natasha Lyonne as Allyson
 June Diane Raphael as Dara
 Michelle Hurd as Libby
 Nathan Corddry as Larry
 Mickey Sumner as Hannah
 Brian Petsos as Peter
 Ronald Guttman as Armando
 Nicole Patrick as Monica
 Reed Birney as Dr. Chalmers
 Murray Bartlett as James Whitney
 Bob Balaban as Mr. Duncan
 Andrea Martin as Stage Zelda

Reception
On review aggregator Rotten Tomatoes, the film holds an approval rating of 22% based on 94 reviews, with an average rating of 4.44/10. The website's critics consensus reads: "Largely witless and disappointingly dull, Girl Most Likely strands the gifted Kristen Wiig in a blandly hollow foray into scattershot sitcom territory." On Metacritic, the film has a weighted average score of 38 out of 100, based on 33 critics, indicating "generally unfavorable reviews".

Upon its festival release, Girl Most Likely garnered mixed reviews from critics. Christopher Schobert from film blog The Playlist called the film "a big-screen sitcom, elevated by Kristen Wiig and Annette Bening". He wrote that Wiig's "likability oozes from every scene in Shari Springer Berman and Robert Pulcini's occasionally winning, a touch too sitcom-y, but often very funny look at one woman's offbeat family and her attempts at discovering just what went wrong on the road to success. It is not, to be sure, Bridesmaids-style humor, and never reaches that blockbuster's belly laugh count. But the film doesn't lack for moments of inspired comedy, and I expect it to find an audience."

Deborah Young, writing for The Hollywood Reporter, also felt that "the film's great strength is its intuitive casting. The actors interact so well that it's hard to single out one performance, though it's perhaps Bening who wins the day for the sexy humanity she gives to the former go-go dancer Zelda. Morgan's screenplay is full of intelligent dialogue that got real laughs from the audience on its Toronto bow." In his review, Justin Chang from Variety felt that "an able cast, led by Kristen Wiig's prickly lead turn, saves this uneven, excessively quirky but ultimately ingratiating story [...] Offering another sly snapshot of the filmmakers' native New York, a la The Nanny Diaries and The Extra Man this soft-bellied crowdpleaser should post modest numbers in specialty play and DVD/VOD rotation.

References

Note

External links
 
 
 
 Cinemablend.com
 Nextprojection.com
 Bigfanboy.com
 Rogerebert.com

2012 films
2012 comedy films
American comedy films
Films directed by Shari Springer Berman and Robert Pulcini
American independent films
Roadside Attractions films
Films scored by Rob Simonsen
Films set in New York City
Films set in New Jersey
Films about dysfunctional families
Films produced by Trudie Styler
2012 independent films
2010s English-language films
2010s American films